Johnny Dundee (November 19, 1893 – April 22, 1965) was an American featherweight and the first world junior lightweight champion boxer who fought from 1910 until 1932. He was inducted into the Ring Magazine Hall of Fame in 1957 and the International Boxing Hall of Fame class of 1991.

Early life
Curreri was born in Sciacca, Sicily.  His father was a fisherman.  His parents immigrated to the United States in 1909.  He was raised on Manhattan's West Side where his father owned a fish shop on 41st Street and 9th Avenue.

Professional career

Name
Curreri was given his ring name in 1910 by his former manager, Scotty Montieth, of Dundee, Scotland.

Curreri retained the name for 22 years, even when he fought under new manager, Jimmy Johnston.

Sports writer, and cartoonist, Hype Igoe, also bestowed the lasting moniker, "The Little Bar of Iron," on Curreri, in homage to his durability.

Early career
Dundee fought his first fight at Sharkey Athletic Club, on 65th Street and Broadway.  He fought under the name "Young Marino."  His opponent was "Skinny Bob."

In 1913, Dundee earned a world title fight in his 87th fight.  He fought 20 rounds against World Featherweight champion, Johnny Kilbane in Vernon, California.  The fight ended in a draw. Dundee would not be afforded an opportunity to fight for the 126-pound featherweight title again for another 10 years.

Junior Lightweight and Featherweight champion

Dundee's loss (in a 15-round decision) to Joe Welling was the first bout to be held after New York enacted the Walker Law, which renewed legal professional boxing, set a 15 round maximum for fights, and created the various weight classes for bouts.

In 1921, Dundee won the junior lightweight championship when his opponent, George "KO" Chaney, was disqualified in the fifth round. The win made Dundee the first universally recognized junior lightweight champion in history.

A year later, Dundee knocked out Danny Frush.  Following the win, he was recognized, in New York State, as the featherweight champion of the world.

On July 6, 1922, Dundee defeated "Little" Jackie Sharkey by unanimous decision in a fifteen-round Junior Lightweight title bout at Ebbets Field in Brooklyn.  Sharkey was briefly down in the fourth round, and again in the fifteenth.  Though the fight was close Dundee won "by a shade".  He was criticized for the fight with the New York Evening World writing that Dundee was "losing his fighting fire" by allowing the bout to go fifteen rounds.

Dundee successfully defended his junior lightweight crown three times before losing it to Jack Bernstein on May 30, 1923.  They fought at the Coney Island Velodrome, in front of a crowd of 15,000.  Dundee was expected to win; however, he lost a unanimous fifteen round decision despite knocking Bernstein down in the third round knockdown.

Less than two months later, Dundee was given the opportunity to fight featherweight champion, and war hero, Eugene Criqui.  He lost 28 pounds in four weeks in order to fight him, making 126 pounds on the days of the fight.  Criqui had beaten Johnny Kilbane two days after Dundee's fight with Bernstein, with a sixth round knockout.  However, part of the contract for this fight required that he give Dundee a shot at the title within sixty days.  Fifty-four days later, on July 26, 1923, Dundee fought Criqui.  He knocked him down four times and beat him by a fifteen-round decision.

Controversial decision
On December 17, 1923, Dundee fought Jack Bernstein again at Madison Square Garden.  The fight ended in a Split Decision.  Several newspapers, including the New York Times, wrote that the judges made the wrong decision. Author Ken Blady wrote that several of the judges may have been influenced to vote against Bernstein.  The Milwaukee Sentinel echoed by printing "By probably the worst decision in local boxing history, Johnny Dundee of Jersey City regained his Junior Lightweight championship from Jack Bernstein."

In contrast, the Milwaukee Journal noted that Dundee finished strong in the bout, and agreed with the decision.  The paper also noted "the sentiment of the crowd, based on the fighters' round by round showing, was that Bernstein had won easily."

With the win, Dundee had unified the featherweight title and the junior lightweight title.

Later career
Less than a year after unifying the title, Dundee lost the junior lightweight title to Steve "Kid" Sullivan on June 20, 1924.  He then relinquished the featherweight crown, on August 10, 1924, at his manager's urging because he had outgrown (in weight) the 126 pound weight limit.

The last significant fight of his career was in 1927 when he challenged featherweight champion Tony Canzoneri, but lost a 15-round decision.

After a three year retirement, Dundee tried to stage a comeback in 1932.  However, two fights into it, he officially retired after posting a six-round decision win over Mickey Greb, and a 10th round lost to Al Dunbar.

Style
In 1965, Al del Greco wrote that Dundee was regarded as a "good southpaw craftsman."

Local New York boxing legend, Johnny Martin, said of Dundee:

Record
Dundee fought 321 fights.  He won 35 percent of his fights, 6 percent ended in knock outs, 10 percent were losses and five percent were draws.  Fifty percent (159) were No Decisions.

In 1957, Dundee was voted into the Boxing Hall of Fame.

Personal life
Dundee married a woman named, Lucille, on June 26, 1912.  They lived at 301 W. 40th Street and had a daughter, also named Lucille, born in 1913.

After beating Frankie Callahan over 10 rounds, on March 16, 1915, the next day, Dundee filed a petition to divorce Lucille, claiming she "beat him up":

Several days later, his wife countersued on the grounds of his "uncontrollable temper."  His wife claimed he knocked her unconscious six months into their marriage, and would often hit himself in the head with a pair of shoes, to the point of drawing blood.  She also claimed he was a philanderer, and that when he left her he gave her a "farewell beating."

Death
On April 9, 1965, Dundee was admitted to East Orange General Hospital in New Jersey.  He died thirteen days later of a respiratory infection complicated by pneumonia.

Dundee, who had become a successful businessman after boxing, left an estate valued at $300,000 ($2.4 million in 2018).

Legacy
Dundee faced many great fighters in the featherweight, junior-lightweight, and lightweight divisions of his era including Benny Leonard (nine times), Lew Tendler (three times), and lightweight champions Freddie Welsh and Willie Ritchie.  Dundee was knocked out only twice in his career – in 1917, he was knocked out in the first round by Willie Jackson in Philadelphia, and in 1929, he was knocked out in Montreal by Al Foreman in the 10th round.

Dundee was regarded as a skillful boxer with great footwork.  Though he had little knockout power, he was widely regarded as being highly skilled at fighting off the ropes.

Statistical boxing website BoxRec lists Dundee as the #3 ranked featherweight of all time, while The Ring Magazine founder Nat Fleischer placed him at #4. The International Boxing Research Organization rates Dundee as the 5th best featherweight boxer ever and boxing historian Bert Sugar placed him 32nd in his Top 100 Fighters catalogue.

During his career he had 331 bouts.  Only two fighters in history, Len Wickwar (463) and Jack Britton (350), had more fights.

Dundee was known to be highly regarded among the boxing community and his peers:

Professional boxing record
All information in this section is derived from BoxRec, unless otherwise stated.

Official record

All newspaper decisions are officially regarded as “no decision” bouts and are not counted in the win/loss/draw column.

Unofficial record

Record with the inclusion of newspaper decisions in the win/loss/draw column.

See also
List of super featherweight boxing champions
List of featherweight boxing champions

References

External links 

 

|-

  

|-

  

|-

  

1893 births
1965 deaths
People from Sciacca
Italian emigrants to the United States
American people of Italian descent
Featherweight boxers
Super-featherweight boxers
Italian male boxers
American male boxers
Infectious disease deaths in Illinois
Sportspeople from the Province of Agrigento